The 1963 Australian Formula Junior Championship was open to racing cars complying with "Australian Formula Junior" regulations. The championship was decided over a single race which was staged at the Warwick Farm Raceway in New South Wales on 8 September 1963. Race distance was 34 laps, 75 miles.

Results
Fourteen cars started in this, the second and final Australian Formula Junior Championship. Results were as follows:

References
	
A History of Australian Motor Sport © 1980
Australian Motor Sport magazine, November 1963
Modern Motor magazine, November 1963
The Sydney Morning Herald, Monday, 9 September 1963

External links
australianformulajunior.com
CAMS Manual online

Australian Formula Junior Championship
Formula Junior Championship
Motorsport at Warwick Farm